is a Japanese novel series written by Mamare Touno and illustrated by Kazuhiro Hara. It began serialization online in 2010 on the user-generated novel publishing website Shōsetsuka ni Narō, being later on acquired by Enterbrain and published as a light novel in Japan since 2011. Yen Press began publishing an English translation in 2015. The series follows the strategist, Shiroe, and the other players of the long-lived MMORPG Elder Tale after they find themselves whisked away into the game world following a game update.

The novel has received four manga adaptations, with one based on the main story and the other three revolving around characters in the series. An anime television series adaptation animated by Satelight aired on NHK Educational TV between October 5, 2013 and March 22, 2014.  A second season by Studio Deen aired between October 4, 2014 and March 28, 2015. A third season by Studio Deen aired between January 13, 2021 and March 31, 2021.

Synopsis

By its eleventh expansion pack, the massively multiplayer online role-playing game (MMORPG)  has become a global success, with a user base of millions of players. However, during the release of its twelfth expansion pack: , thirty thousand Japanese gamers who are logged on at the time of the update suddenly find themselves transported into the virtual game world and donning their in-game avatars. In the midst of the event, a socially awkward gamer named Shiroe, along with his friends Naotsugu and Akatsuki, decide to team up so that they may face this world, which unfortunately has now become their reality, along with the challenges and obstacles ahead of them.

Publication

Log Horizon began as a light novel written by Mamare Touno. It initially appeared in installments on the user-generated content site Shōsetsuka ni Narō ("So You Want to be a Novelist") starting on April 13, 2010, and subsequently published in book form by Enterbrain since March 2011. Yen Press obtained the rights on its light novel imprint to release the novels in English from 2015.

Media

Manga

The novel series has received four manga adaptations, all written by Mamare Touno. The first adaptation is illustrated by Motoya Matsu and titled, Log Horizon Gaiden: Honey Moon Logs. It began serialization on January 27, 2012, and is published by ASCII Media Works in the Dengeki Daioh magazine. The second adaptation is illustrated by Kazuhiro Hara and titled Log Horizon. It began serialization on May 18, 2012, and was published by Enterbrain in the Famitsu Comic Clear web magazine. Yen Press obtained this manga for an English release. The third adaptation is illustrated by Koyuki and titled, Log Horizon: The West Wind Brigade. It began serialization on July 9, 2012, ended on March 9, 2018, and was published by Fujimi Shobo in the Age Premium magazine. Another manga illustrated by Sōchū and titled, Log Horizon Gaiden: Nyanta-honcho Shiawase no Recipe began serialization on December 21, 2012, ended on March 31, 2018, and was published by Enterbrain in the Comic B's LOG magazine and collected in six volumes. A manga Log Horizon: Kanami, Go! East! illustrated by Kou was serialized in Comic B's LOG from October 1, 2015, to December 1, 2016, and compiled in two volumes.

Anime

A 25-episode anime adaptation produced by Satelight aired on NHK Educational TV from October 5, 2013 to March 22, 2014. The series was streamed as a simulcast by Crunchyroll in North America and other select parts of the world.

A 25-episode second season produced by Studio Deen aired from October 4, 2014 to March 28, 2015. Both seasons were licensed by Sentai Filmworks in North America for digital and home video release. Funimation acquired the streaming rights to the series after Sentai Filmworks lost the rights. Following Sony's acquisition of Crunchyroll, the series was moved to Crunchyroll. For both seasons, the opening theme is "database" by Man with a Mission featuring Takuma. The ending theme for the first season is "Your song*" and for the second season it is "Wonderful Wonder World*", both performed by Yunchi.

A 12-episode third season titled  was originally scheduled to premiere in October 2020, but was delayed to Winter 2021 due to the COVID-19 pandemic. The third season aired from January 13 to March 31, 2021. The third season is named after the title of Volume 12 of the web novel series and the official acronym is DORT.  The staff and cast will reprise their roles from the second season. Funimation licensed the third season and will stream it on its website in North America, the British Isles, Mexico, and Brazil, in Europe through Wakanim, and in Australia and New Zealand through AnimeLab.

Music

Reception
Rebecca Silverman of the Anime News Network noted that the series has "its own unique take on what has become a subgenre of fantasy" when compared to the previous Sword Art Online and the earlier .hack series. With respect to the anime adaptation, Silverman noted that one of the major drawbacks was the artistry. She held the designs of the characters with small regard, calling them "somewhat bland and generic in design, which is a bit of an accomplishment given how many character creation options there apparently are". She used the design of Akatsuki as an example, explaining that the character's beauty has to be constantly reminded to the audience despite the fact that "she's one of the less striking female characters on screen". Another issue Silverman pointed out was the apparent overuse of Naotsugu's perverted nature for comedic relief and finding that for some viewers he may be "line-crossingly obnoxious". Despite these drawbacks, Silverman remarked that the "show shouldn't be dismissed as 'just another ripoff' before giving it a chance" since "it has the potential to expand rather than rehash the basic premise of players trapped in a game".

Notes

References

External links
 Log Horizon (Initially published edition) at Shōsetsuka ni Narō. 
 List of permissioned fan fictions 
 Official anime website 
 
 Official support website for table-talk role-playing game Log Horizon TRPG 
 Mamare Touno's official information website 
 Mamare Touno's personal website

Book series introduced in 2010
2010s fantasy novels
2011 Japanese novels
2021 anime television series debuts
Anime and manga based on novels
ASCII Media Works manga
Enterbrain
Enterbrain manga
Fujimi Shobo manga
Crunchyroll anime
Isekai anime and manga
Isekai novels and light novels
Japanese fantasy novels
Light novels
Light novels first published online
Massively multiplayer online role-playing games in fiction
NHK original programming
Novels first published in serial form
Satelight
Sentai Filmworks
Science fiction anime and manga
Shōnen manga
Shōsetsuka ni Narō
Studio Deen
Yen Press titles